Monica's Gang in an Adventure in Time is a 2007 Brazilian animated film based on the Monica's Gang comic books. The film was directed and co-written by Mauricio de Sousa, creator of over two hundred characters featured in the comic books. It is the only installment in the franchise to be released by Disney via Buena Vista International.

Plot
Monica's Gang in an Adventure in Time begins with Franklin finishing up his time travel machine. He explains to his dog Blu that it works with the synthesis of the four elements. Just outside, Jimmy Five and Smudge concoct an "infallible plan" to steal Monica's blue toy rabbit, Samson. The plan eventually fails when Monica, while on a picnic with Maggy, discovers it. Jimmy Five and Smudge hide in Franklin's office. Monica and Maggy follow them there, where Monica accidentally throws her rabbit on Franklin's machine, causing the elements to travel to different periods in time. Franklin sends each child into a different time after the elements in order to bring them back. If they fail, time will slow down and eventually stop. Monica and Blu end up in Prehistoric times to recover the element of fire. Jimmy Five is sent to the 30th century to recover the element of air. Maggy is sent to a few years back (when the kids were babies) to recover the element of earth. Smudge is sent to an indigenous tribe in Colonial-era Brazil to recover water.

The people they meet are all characters of other sister series of the original Monica's Gang comics (who are also well known to the Brazilian audiences), with exception of the villains "Bandeirante" (a greedy Portuguese man in search for gold named after the explorers of Colonial Brazil) and "Cabeleira Negra" (literally "black hair", a descendant from Black Beard and space pirate from the 30th century).

Cast
 Marli Bortoletto as Monica
 Angélica Santos as Jimmy Five
 Paulo Cavalcante as Smudge
 Elza Gonçalves as Maggy
 Sibele Toledo as Franklin
 Bianca Rinaldi as Cabeleira Negra
 Maurício de Sousa as Blu and Monica's Dad

References

External links
 
 

2000s adventure comedy films
2000s fantasy comedy films
2000s science fiction comedy films
2007 animated films
2007 comedy films
2007 films
Films distributed by Disney
Animated comedy films
Animated films about time travel
Animated films based on comics
Brazilian animated science fiction films
Films set in the 30th century
Monica's Gang films
2000s Portuguese-language films
Space adventure films
2000s English-language films